Sumalatha (born 27 August 1963) is an Indian actress,  politician who is the current Member of Parliament in the Lok Sabha from Mandya,  Karnataka. She has acted in more than 220 films in Kannada, Telugu, Malayalam, Tamil and Hindi.  She gained popularity in Telugu cinema and Malayalam cinema and later married Kannada actor-politician Ambareesh and has a son Abhishek Gowda.

In March 2019, Sumalatha announced that she would seek election for Lok Sabha from Mandya constituency of Karnataka as an independent candidate. On  23 May 2019, Sumalatha won against Nikhil Kumaraswamy by a margin of more than 1.25 lakh votes in the Lok Sabha election.

Career

Sumalatha did her schooling at St. Joseph's Convent School, Brodipet, Guntur. She began acting at age 15, after winning an Andhra Pradesh beauty contest in 1979. After her pictures began circulating in the magazines, film producer D. Ramanaidu expressed interest in casting her in his film and offered her a signining amount of 1,001 in 1979. However, she made her film debut in Tamil with Thisai Maariya Paravaigal (1979). She was named the Best New Face following the film. Her Kannada entry was through Ravichandra opposite to Rajkumar. She entered Telugu through Samajaniki Saval (1979), and Malayalam through Moorkhan (1980). She appeared in films in many languages Kannada, Tamil, Malayalam and Telugu early in her career. She was Rajinikanth's second heroine besides Rati Agnihotri in films like Murattu Kaalai and Kazhugu. She was the heroine of legendary Malayalam actor Jayan's last film Kolilakkam (1981). In her Malayalam entry film Moorkhan, she acted as Jayan's second heroine.  Her most memorable Malayalam films include Thazhvaram, Isabella, Nirakkoottu, Dhinarathrangal, Thoovanathumbikal, Parampara and New Delhi. She has acted in many Kannada movies like Aahuti, Avatara Purusha, Tayi Kanasu, Karna, Hong Kong nalli Agent Amar Tayiya Hone, Kallarali Hoovagi with Ravichandra being her Kannada debut in which she acted with actor Rajkumar. Telugu is the language in which she acted the most followed by Malayalam and Kannada.

She received the best actress Nandi Award for her role in Shrutilayalu in 1987. She is a close friend of actress Suhasini Maniratnam, her co-star in a Telugu movie. The friendship between the two provided the material for a candid scene in the film, when director Kodandarami Reddy noticed Suhasini combing Sumalatha's long hair on the train journey to the film set. Reddy asked his cameraman, Ashok Reddy, to film the two and added the scene to the movie's final cut.

Sumalatha reportedly speaks six languages, and has acted in five.

Personal life

Sumalatha married Kannada actor and politician Ambareesh on 8 December 1991 and their son Abhishek Gowda was born in the year 1993. She starred alongside Ambareesh in movies like Aahuti, Avatara Purusha, Kallarali Hoovagi, New Delhi and Sri Manjunatha. Kallarali Hoovagi went on to win a National Film Award.

In an interview with TV9 Kannada, the couple revealed that they first met each other on the sets of the movie Aahuti. In the course of the interview, Sumalatha expressed that Ambareesh was extroverted and gregarious in nature where as she leaned more towards having an introverted and conscientious personality on the sets. She shared memories of Ambareesh giving her friendly advice to mingle with other co-stars in the set by involving herself in group activities; else it could lead to misunderstandings. She revealed that it was Ambareesh's bold, genuine, carefree, down to earth personality that made him memorable and attractive to her.

On 24 November 2018 Ambareesh died due to a cardiac arrest. Few days after Sumalatha shared an emotional letter addressed to late Ambareesh on 8 December 2018 the eve of their 27th marriage anniversary.

On 6 July 2020 It was reported that Sumalatha tested positive for COVID-19 and placed herself in home quarantine.

Political life
In March 2019, Sumalatha announced that she would be contesting as an independent candidate in the 2019 Indian general election in Karnataka (Lok Sabha) from Mandya. She was backed by big stars from the Kannada film industry like Darshan, Yash, Rockline Venkatesh, Doddanna. Bharatiya Janata Party decided not to field a candidate in Mandya in efforts to support her. Some of the Congress Party workers supported her indirectly due to the history of traditional rivalry between JDS - Congress rivalry in Mandya which was a tricky situation for congress. She won, defeating Nikhil with a margin of 128,876 votes. She is the first Independent woman Member of parliament from Karnataka.

Awards
 Devar's Best New Face Award: Thisai Maariya Paravaigal (1979) (Tamil)
 Special Jury Nandi award (Best Actress): Shrutilayalu (1987) (Telugu)
 Film Fans Award for Best Actress: Shrutilayalu (1987) (Telugu)
 Kerala Film Critics Award for Best Actress: New Delhi and Thoovanathumbikal (1987) (Malayalam)
 Lux Award for Best Actress: New Delhi (1987) (Malayalam)
 Film Fans Award for Best Actress: New Delhi (1987) (Hindi)
 Kerala Film Critics Award for Best Actress: Isabella (1988) (Malayalam)

Filmography

Malayalam

 Naayika (2011) as herself (Archive footage/Uncredited cameo)
 Kandahar (2010) as Sumangaly
 Purappadu (1990) as Nalini
 Parampara (1990) as Meera
 Ee Thanutha Veluppan Kalathu (1990) as Lakshmi Haridas
 No.20 Madras Mail (1990) as Sr. Gloria
 Thazhvaram (1990)  as Kochootti
 Nair Saab (1989)  as Prabha
 Unnikrishnante Adyathe Christmas (1988) as Sophia
 Dhinarathrangal (1988) as Dr. Savithri
 David David Mr. David (1988)
 Isabella (1988) as Isabella
 New Delhi (1987) as Maria Fernandez
 Thoovanathumbikal (1987) as Clara
 Shyama (1986) as Lakshmi
 Nirakkoottu (1985) as Mercy
 Idavelakku Shesham (1984) as Sindhu
 Alakadalinakkare (1984) as Mohan's wife
 Himam (1983) as Indu
 Chakravalam Chuvannappol (1983) as Latha
 Kodunkattu (1983) as Sreekala
 Kilukilukkam (1982)
 John Jaffer Janardhanan (1982) as Jeny
 Thadaakam (1982) as Sabira
 Kazhumaram (1982) as Radhika
 Aarambham (1982) as Santha
 Dheera (1982) as Rathi 
 Irattimadhuram (1982) as Sangeetha
 Aranjaanam (1982) as Anu
 Aadarsham (1982) as Radha 
 Thenum Vayambum (1981) as Sreedevi
 Ithihasam (1981) as Shobha
 Munnettam (1981) as Ramani
 Kolilakkam (1981) as Suma
 Raktham (1981) as Valsala
 Kadathu (1981) as ThulasiKilungaatha Changalakal
 Saahasam (1981)
 Ellam Ninakku Vendi (1981) as Sreedevi
 Kilungaatha Changalakal (1981) as Latha
 Nizhal Yudham (1981) as Radha
 Moorkhan (1980) as Raji
 Vilangum Veenayum

Telugu

 Karunamayudu (1978)
 Samajaniki Saval (1979)
 Rajadhi Raju (1980) as Lilly
 Bhola Shankarudu (1980)
 Kalam Marindi
 Girija Kalyanam (1981) as Rosy
 Agni Poolu (1981)
 Jeevitha Ratham (1981) 
 Pelleedu Pillalu (1982) as Poorna
 Subhalekha (1982) as Sujata
 Hima Bindu (1982)
 Savaal (1982)
 Aalaya Sikharam (1983) as Radha
 Khaidi (1983) as Dr. Sujata
  Raghu Ramudu (1983)
 Rangula Puli (1983)
 Bharya Bhartala Saval (1983)
  Bahudoorapu Batasari (1983)
 Amarajeevi (1983)
 Merupu Daadi (1984) as Sivangi 
 Justice Chakravarthy (1984) as Latha
 Janani Janmabhoomi (1984) as Pammy/Padmini
 Agni Gundam (1984)
  Kai Raja Kai (1984)
 Jagan (1984)
Bhola Shankarudu (1984)
Pulijoodam (1984)
Uddhandudu (1984)
 Nayakulaku Saval (1984)
 Jackie (1985)
 Chattamtho Poratam (1985) as Kalyani
 Kattula Kondaiah (1985) as Jyothi
 Ranarangam (1985)
Mugguru Mitrulu (1985)
 Srimathi Garu (1985)
Illalu Vardhillu (1985)
 Veta (1986)  as Jyothirmayi
 Tandra Paparayudu (1986) as Subhadra
 Rakshasudu (1986) as Vani
 Jeevana Ragam (1986)
 Iddaru Mithrulu (1986)
 Jailu Pakshi (1986)
 Nampalli Nagu (1986) 
Ashtalakshmi Vaibhavam (1986)
 Thandri Kodukula Challenge (1987)
 Sruthi Layalu (1987) as Sita
 Pasivadi Pranam (1987)
 Swayam Krushi (1987) as Sharada
 Viswanatha Nayakudu (1987)
 Punnami Chandrudu (1987)
 Raaga Leela (1987) 
 Donga Kollu (1988) as Neeraja
 Antima Teerpu (1988) as Vasanta
  Donga Pelli (1988)
 Jamadagni (1988)
 Jayammu Nischayammu Raa as Shanti
 * Guru Sishyulu (1990)
 Gang Leader (1991) as Latha
 Dabbu Bhale Jabbu (1992) as Hema
 Raja Kumarudu (1999) as Rajya Lakshmi
Okkadu Chalu (2000)
 Sri Manjunatha (2001) as Sumalatha Devi
 Boss (2006)
 Srirastu Subhamastu (2016)

Kannada

 Ravichandra (1980)
 Thayiya Kanasu (1985)
 Aahuti (1985)
 Thayiya Hone (1985) as Suma
 Thayi Mamathe (1985)
 Karna (1986)
 Kathanayaka (1986)
 Sathya Jyothi (1986)
 Maheshwara (1986)
 Huli Hebbuli (1987)
 New Delhi (1988) as Vasantha
 Hongkongnalli Agent Amar (1988)
 Nyayakkagi Naanu (1991)
 Kaliyuga Bheema (1991)
 Sri Manjunatha (2001) as Sumalatha Devi
 Paris Pranaya (2003)
 Excuse Me (2003)
 Kanchana Ganga (2004)
 Kallarali Hoovagi (2006)
 Bhoopathi (2007)
 Ee Sambhashane (2009)
 Viraat (2016) as Viraat's mother
 Bhale Jodi (2016)
 Jessie (2016) as Jessie's mother
 Doddmane Hudga (2016) as Doddamane Rajeevo's wife
 Thayige Thakka Maga (2018) as Parvathi
 D/O Parvathamma (2019) as Parvathamma
 India vs England (2020) as Janaki

Tamil

 Thisai Maariya Paravaigal (1979)
 Murattu Kaalai (1980) as Soundarya
 Madhavi Vandhal (1980)
 Azhaithal Varuven (1980) as Rani
 Kazhugu (1981) as Suma
 Karaiyellam Shenbagapoo (1981) as Snegalatha
 Pen Manam Pesugirathu (1981)
 Aradhanai (1981)
 Enakkaga Kaathiru (1981)
 Sollathe Yarum Kettaal (1981)
 Kudumbam Oru Kadambam (1981) as Uma
 Theerpu (1982)
 Azhagiya Kanne (1982)
 Oru Varisu Uruvagiradhu (1982)
 Oru Odai Nadhiyagirathu (1983)

Hindi
 New Delhi (1988) as Maria Fernandes
 Pratibandh (1990) as Naseem
 Swarg Yahan Narak Yahan (1991) as Suman V. Kumar
 Aaj Ka Goonda Raj (1992) as Ritu Saxena
 Pardesi (1993)
 Dushman Duniya Ka (1996) as Reshma
 Mahaanta (1997) as Shanti Malhotra
 Kshatriya (1993) as Suman, Maharaja Prithvi Singh's wife (Surjangarh)

References

External links

 

Living people
Actresses in Malayalam cinema
Actresses in Tamil cinema
Actresses in Telugu cinema
Actresses in Kannada cinema
Indian film actresses
Actresses from Chennai
20th-century Indian actresses
21st-century Indian actresses
1963 births
India MPs 2019–present
Women members of the Lok Sabha
Indian actor-politicians
Actresses in Hindi cinema
Telugu people
People from Guntur district
Independent politicians in India
Lok Sabha members from Karnataka
21st-century Indian women politicians